Estadio Municipal is a multi-use stadium in Marco de Canaveses, Portugal.  It is currently used mostly for football matches and is the home stadium of Marco 09. The stadium is able to hold 10,000 people.

At end of 2007, it will change officially the name for Estádio Municipal do Marco de Canaveses. 

Avelino Ferreira Torres
Sports venues in Porto District